Presidencia de la Plaza or simply Plaza is a town in Chaco Province, Argentina. It is the head town of the Presidencia de la Plaza Department.

The area was first settled in 1911 and was officially founded in 1921 and named in honour of the former President Victorino de la Plaza.

In 2005 the Instituto Nacional de Tecnología Agropecuaria opened a station in the town.

External links

Populated places in Chaco Province
Populated places established in 1921